{{DISPLAYTITLE:C20H40O2}}
The molecular formula C20H40O2 (molar mass: 312.53 g/mol, exact mass: 312.3028 u) may refer to:

 Arachidic acid, also called eicosanoic acid
 Phytanic acid

Molecular formulas